Lucia Di Guglielmo (born 26 June 1997) is an Italian professional footballer who plays as a right-back for Serie A club AS Roma and the Italy women's national team.

Club career
Prior to her July 2021 move to Roma, Di Guglielmo spent most of her career in Tuscany, most notably spending ten years playing at Castelfranco, a club which eventually became Empoli.

International career
Di Guglielmo made her debut for the Italy national team on 24 February 2021, coming on as a substitute for Valentina Bergamaschi against Israel.

References

1997 births
Living people
Italian women's footballers
Women's association football fullbacks
S.S.D. Empoli Ladies FBC players
A.S. Roma (women) players
Serie A (women's football) players
Italy women's international footballers
UEFA Women's Euro 2022 players